The 93rd Illinois General Assembly, consisting of the Illinois Senate and the Illinois House of Representatives, existed from January 8, 2003 to January 11, 2005 during the first and second years of Rod Blagojevich's first term as governor of Illinois. The General Assembly met at the State Capitol.

In the regular session of the 93rd General Assembly, the Senate was in session for 160 legislative days, and the House was in session for 179 legislative days. The governor also called the General Assembly into special session 17 times. These special sessions included six days that were not part of any regular session.

All 118 members of the House, and all 59 members of the Senate, were elected in the 2002 election.  While 2002 saw a nationwide swing toward the Republican Party, in Illinois the Democratic Party gained a government trifecta for the first time in decades. The Democrats gained control of the Senate for the first time since the election of 1992. Blagojevich was the first Democratic governor elected since 1972.

The apportionment of seats was based on the 2000 census. Both chambers had a Democratic majority. 

The 93rd General Assembly was followed by the 94th General Assembly in January 2005.

Legislation 

The 93rd General Assembly enacted 1,102 bills into law.

Among these was the Health Care Justice Act, which sought "to insure that all residents have access to quality health care at costs that are affordable." The HCJA was spearheaded by the chair of the Senate Health and Human Services Committee, Barack Obama. Supporters and opponents regarded the struggle over the HCJA as foreshadowing the struggle over the federal Affordable Care Act during the Obama presidency.  While originally intended to establish single-payer healthcare in the state, the act's ultimate form was more modest. The act created a task force and "strongly encouraged" the Illinois General Assembly to implement a health care access plan by July 1, 2007, that would meet eight objectives including providing access to a full range of healthcare services, maintaining and improving healthcare quality, and providing "portability of coverage, regardless of employment status". Much like its federal successor, the HCJA passed with no Republican support in the state Senate. The governor signed the HCJA into law on August 20, 2004.

Senate 

Under the 1970 Illinois Constitution, the Illinois Senate has 59 members. The members are elected to overlapping two- and four-year terms. Thirty votes are required for a majority, and 36 votes (or 60%) are required to override a veto or propose a constitutional amendment.

In the first year following redistricting, all 59 Senate seats are up for election. The Illinois legislative districts were redistricted in 2001. In the 2002 election, 39 Senators were elected to four-year terms, and 20 were elected to two-year terms.

Senate leadership

Party composition 

The Senate of the 93rd General Assembly consisted of 32 Democrats, 26 Republicans, and one Independent. The independent Senator, James T. Meeks of Chicago, caucused with the Democrats. He was elected on the Honesty and Integrity Party ticket.

State Senators

House 

The Illinois House has 118 members who are elected every two years. A simple majority of 60 votes is required to pass a bill; a 60% supermajority is required to override a veto or propose a constitutional amendment.

The composition of the 93rd House reflects the results of the 2002 election, in which the Democrats maintained their majority. 24 new members joined the chamber, and three Representatives who had previously been appointed to fill vacancies were elected for the first time. 89 House incumbents were re-elected.

House leadership

Party composition 

The 93rd House consisted of 66 Democrats and 52 Republicans.

State Representatives

See also 
108th United States Congress
List of Illinois state legislatures

Works cited 

Legislative Districts of Illinois
Legislators' Portraits and Biographies

References

External links 
Official site

2003 in Illinois
2004 in Illinois
Illinois legislative sessions
2003 U.S. legislative sessions
2004 U.S. legislative sessions